Nur Uddin Ahmed Gohorpuri (1924 – 26 April 2005) was a Bengali Muslim religious scholar and teacher. He was notable for his association with Qawmi Madrasahs in Bangladesh as well as for having been the founder of Gohorpur Hussainia Madrasa.

Biography

Gohorpuri was born in 1924 to an aristocratic family in the village of Gohorpur, located in what is now Sylhet Division, Bangladesh. His father was Mawlana Zuhur Uddin Ahmad and his mother was Suratunnesa. He studied at a local maktab in Sultanpur. Following the death of his father, who had been a scholar, Gohorpuri was given at a young age to Bashir Uddin Shaykh-e-Bagha, a religious figure, to be trained as his disciple. He continued his studies in Purbabhag Madrasa in Jalalpur and Bagha Alia Madrasa where he finished his third year. Bashir Uddin helped him enrol in Darul Uloom Deoband, where Gohorpuri was taught hadith by Hussain Ahmed Madani, who had been Bashir Uddin's teacher. Following his graduation in 1950, Gohorpuri became one of Madani's pupils himself. In 1950, he set a world record by passing the title from the world-renowned Darul Uloom Deoband and securing the first place in the merit list.

In 1952, upon Izaz Ali Amrohi and Madani's instructions, he became employed as a hadith scholar at the Pangasia Alia Madrasa in Barisal for two years, before transferring to perform the same role at the Balia Ashraful Uloom Madrasa in Mymensingh. In 1956, he returned to his native village and founded the Gohorpur Hussainia Madrasa, serving there as the hadith scholar and muhtamim (principal) for the remainder of his life. It later became one of the most prominent Islamic educational institutions in Bangladesh.

During the 1960s, Gohorpuri joined the Jamiat Ulema-e-Islam political party, running unsuccessfully for the National Assembly during the 1970 Pakistani general election. He was elected chairman of Befaqul Madarisil Arabia Bangladesh in 1996, becoming associated with more than 50 Qawmi Madrasahs as well as being the founder and patron of 13.

Gohorpuri died on 26 April 2005 at the age of 81. He left behind four wives, four daughters and a son, Muslehuddin Raju, the latter of whom succeeded him as head of Gohorpur Hussainia Madrasa. His funeral in front of his home in Gohorpur was attended by several thousand of his pupils.

References

1924 births
2005 deaths
People from Balaganj Upazila
Bangladeshi Sunni Muslim scholars of Islam
Bengali Muslim scholars of Islam
20th-century Bengalis
21st-century Bengalis
Deobandis
Disciples of Hussain Ahmad Madani